Schelotto is an Italian surname. Notable people with the surname include:

Ezequiel Schelotto (born 1989), Argentine-Italian footballer
Guillermo Barros Schelotto (born 1973), Argentine footballer
Gustavo Barros Schelotto (born 1973), Argentine footballer

Italian-language surnames